José Eulogio Hernández, better known by his stage name El Potro de Sinaloa, is a Regional Mexican singer, specializing in the styles of Banda and Pacific Norteño. 

Both of his brothers, Ignacio and Tomas, had careers as musicians in Mexico. Fellow Regional Mexican artist, Larry Hernández is his distant cousin. Early in his career he adopted his stage name (which means "the colt of Sinaloa"), and became a popular performer throughout the country. In 1996, he signed with Sony Records; he later recorded for EMI and then Lideres, a Universal Records subsidiary. In 2007 he was nominated for a Grammy award.

Discography
Con los Caballeros (Linda, 1995)
Potrillos (Linda, 1995)
Puñales de Fuego (Sony Records, 1996)
Que Bonito Es el Amor (EMI, 1998)
Pobre de Mi Corazon (Lideres, 2001)
Mi Corazon Ya Te Olvido (Lideres, 2002)
Dos Amores (Veranito, 2005)
No Me Quites Tu Amor (Machete Music, 2007)
El Primer Tiempo (Machete, 2007)
Me Caiste del Cielo (Veranito, 2007)
Los Mejores Corridos Vol.1 (Machete, 2007)
Los Mejores Corridos Vol.2 (Machete, 2007)
Grandes Exitos Originales (Machete, 2008)
Dejame Vacio (Fonovisa Records, 2008)
Cargamento Del Diablo (2009)
Narco Edicion (2009)
Serie Diamante: 30 Super Exitos (2009)
El Enemigo Publico (2010)
 Sin Fronteras (Universal Latin Music Entertainment 2012)
Jerarquia De Corridos' con Power Sinaloense (2014)
A Mi Estilo (2014)
El Maz Poderoso ( Refuego Music 2015)
Romantico y Cachondo (Music Eyes 2017)
Y Sigue La Mata Dando ( Afinarte Music 2018)
Tiro de Gracia Single  (Afinarte Music 2019)
El Solicitado Single (Afinarte Music 2019)
Juegos de Poderes Single  (Afinarte Music 2019)
Déjame Vacio  (Refuego Music 2019)
El Picos Single ( Afinarte Music 2018)
Seguimos Galopando  (Refuego Music 2020)
Gajes del Oficio  (Refuego Music 2021)

Awards and nominations 
2007 50th Annual Grammy Awards
Nominated Regional Mexican Album of the Year

2007 Premios de La Radio 

 Won Regional Mexican Artist of the Year, Male 
 Won Regional Mexican Best Corrido of the Year
2008 Latin Billboard Music Awards
 Nominated Regional Mexican Airplay Song of the Year, Male Solo 
2008 Premios de La Radio
 Won Regional Mexican Artist of the Year, Male
2009 Premio Lo Nuestro Awards
 Nominated Regional Mexican Banda Artist of the Year 
 Nominated Regional Mexican Artist of the Year, Male
2010 BMI Latin Awards Award-Winning Songs
 Déjame Vacio Juan José Leyva Juan Diego Sandoval Editora Arpa Musical El Potro de Sinaloa Fonovisa Records

External links 
 El Potro de Sinaloa Official Instagram https://instagram.com/elpotrodesinaloa/

El Potro de Sinaloa official facebook
https://www.facebook.com/ElPotroDeSinaloaMusica/

References 
[ El Potro de Sinaloa] at Allmusic
http://www.grammy.com/photos/el-potro-de-sinaloa
http://www.eonline.com/news/56915/nominations-for-50th-annual-grammy-awards
2008 Latin Billboard Music Awards
http://premios.estrellatv.com/fotos/la-historia-de-premios-de-la-radio/
http://metrolatinousa.com/2007/11/17/octava-edicion-de-los-premios-de-la-radio-2007-en-california/
https://www.webcitation.org/6DvQXYqMj?url=http://www.bmi.com/news/entry/juanes_receives_presidents_award_at_17th_annual_bmi_latin_music_awards

Mexican musicians
Living people
1977 births